Port Morris Ferry Bridges, also known as the 134th Street Ferry Bridges, are two historic bridges located in the Port Morris neighborhood of the Bronx, New York City.  They were built in 1948 by the New York, New Haven and Hartford Railroad, and are constructed of steel and copper in industrial-style truss construction.  Each bridge stands four to five stories tall and covered in corrugated steel metal.  They feature wire rope pulley systems, wooden gangways, and pontoons.  They were constructed to hoist the bases of ferry boats in and out of the river as they came into dock.

It was added to the National Register of Historic Places in 2014. Today the property is shared between the New York City Transit Authority and the New York City Police Department.

References

External links
Comprehensive List of Float Bridges Located Throughout New York Harbor (1866-Present) 

Bridges on the National Register of Historic Places in New York City
Bridges completed in 1948
New York, New Haven and Hartford Railroad
National Register of Historic Places in the Bronx
Bridges on the National Register of Historic Places in New York (state)
Bridges on the National Register of Historic Places
Bridges in the Bronx
Steel bridges in the United States
Port Morris, Bronx